Lawnmower Man or The Lawnmower Man may refer to:

 "The Lawnmower Man", a 1975 short story by Stephen King
 The Lawnmower Man (film), a 1992 film that shares the title of the King short story
 The Lawnmower Man (video game), a 1993 video game produced by Atod and based on the film
 Lawn Mower Man, the second studio album by Canadian rapper Madchild